Tardeli Barros Machado Reis (born 2 March 1990), simply known as Tardeli, is a professional Brazilian football player who plays as a striker for Thai League 1 club Nongbua Pitchaya.

Honours

Individual
Thai League 1 Top Scorer: 2020–21
Thai League 1 Best XI: 2020–21
Thai League 2 Top Scorer: 2018

References

1990 births
Living people
Brazilian footballers
Association football forwards
Barros Tardeli
Barros Tardeli
K League 1 players
Esporte Clube Bahia players
Samutsongkhram F.C. players
Barros Tardeli
Barros Tardeli
Barros Tardeli
Barros Tardeli
Suwon FC players
Barros Tardeli
Brazilian expatriate footballers
Expatriate footballers in Thailand
Brazilian expatriate sportspeople in Thailand
Expatriate footballers in South Korea
Brazilian expatriate sportspeople in South Korea